East Germantown is a town in Jackson Township, Wayne County, in the U.S. state of Indiana. The population was 410 at the 2010 census.

History
East Germantown was originally called Georgetown, and under the latter name was laid out and platted in 1827.

A post office was established at East Germantown in 1846, and remained in operation until it was discontinued in 1917.

Geography
East Germantown is located at  (39.812803, -85.138020).

Demographics

2010 census
As of the census of 2010, there were 410 people, 155 households, and 121 families living in the town. The racial makeup of the town was 97.8% White, 0.2% African American, 0.2% Native American, 0.2% Asian, 0.7% from other races, and 0.7% from two or more races. Hispanic or Latino of any race were 0.7% of the population.

There were 155 households, of which 37.4% had children under the age of 18 living with them, 54.8% were married couples living together, 16.1% had a female householder with no husband present, 7.1% had a male householder with no wife present, and 21.9% were non-families. 16.8% of all households were made up of individuals, and 7.7% had someone living alone who was 65 years of age or older. The average household size was 2.65 and the average family size was 2.92.

The median age in the town was 39.4 years. 23.4% of residents were under the age of 18; 9.5% were between the ages of 18 and 24; 25.4% were from 25 to 44; 26.1% were from 45 to 64; and 15.6% were 65 years of age or older. The gender makeup of the town was 48.5% male and 51.5% female.

2000 census
As of the census of 2000, there were 243 people, 95 households, and 72 families living in the town. The racial makeup of the town was 100.00% White. Hispanic or Latino of any race were 0.82% of the population.

There were 95 households, out of which 37.9% had children under the age of 18 living with them, 61.1% were married couples living together, 9.5% had a female householder with no husband present, and 23.2% were non-families. 23.2% of all households were made up of individuals, and 12.6% had someone living alone who was 65 years of age or older. The average household size was 2.56 and the average family size was 2.95.

In the town, the population was spread out, with 28.4% under the age of 18, 4.1% from 18 to 24, 29.2% from 25 to 44, 26.7% from 45 to 64, and 11.5% who were 65 years of age or older. The median age was 38 years. For every 100 females, there were 94.4 males. For every 100 females age 18 and over, there were 93.3 males.

The median income for a household in the town was $30,714, and the median income for a family was $35,000. Males had a median income of $31,250 versus $19,063 for females. The per capita income for the town was $12,827. About 15.0% of families and 15.3% of the population were below the poverty line, including 15.0% of those under the age of eighteen and 37.5% of those 65 or over.

References

External links
 WayNet.org's page on East Germantown, Indiana

Towns in Indiana
Towns in Wayne County, Indiana